Grapetree Records was a record label founded by Knolly Williams.  It was active from the early 1990s to the early 2000s.

History

Beginning
In 1988, Knolly Williams was anxious enough to avoid the temptations inside Los Angeles to spend a summer in Austin, Texas working for his uncle. Although he had given up his dreams of rap stardom as part of his commitment to Christianity, he allowed himself to write verses he deemed "poetry" but suspiciously resembled lyrics.

According to Williams, the path toward founding a Christian rap label followed God's giving him the name "Grapetree." Biblically speaking, Williams says the name represents a combination of people that were about to be destroyed (grapes) and the fully restored state of man in Christ (trees).

After getting his GED, starting college, and working a series of Austin-area graphic design and retail management jobs, Williams decided to launch Grapetree in 1993 with his first release as Rubadub, Reflections of an Ex-Criminal. His second release, Mind of a Gangsta, wound up setting the tone for the upstart company.

By then, Williams had signed a distribution deal with Diamante Music Group, a mid-size distributor that handled retail accounts for more than 40 Christian indies. Three years later, Grapetree stood as the coalition's bestselling label, with each Grapetree release averaging 10,000-25,000 units. At that point, Grapetree was releasing as many as 30 albums a year. To Williams' surprise, finding the label's talent wasn't difficult. Grapetree artists routinely found other MCs disenfranchised by street life on the road and turned them on to Williams. By 1995, Williams brought his wife onboard full-time and quickly began amassing a staff.

In 1999, Grapetree signed a lucrative distribution deal with EMI, the parent company of Capital Records.

Grapetree was featured on ABC, NBC, FOX, CBS, Newsweek and in over 300 newspapers worldwide. The company grew to become the largest independent label in Central Texas and the world leader for the genre, with over one million CD units sold. However by 2001, the music industry had suffered a severe blow with the onset of digital downloading. And, like the high-tech industry, sales came to an almost stand-still. After 12 profitable years, the bottom fell out of the business when the music industry switched to "digital". The situation worsened quickly, and before long, Williams was facing default and possible foreclosure. Fortunately, he and his wife Josie had built enough equity in their home to be able to sell, without having to bring money to the table. The experience of nearly losing their home, however, left Williams reeling—and gave him a perspective that he would carry with him into a new career in real estate.

Divisions
 GT Latin
 Phat Boy Music
 Diamond Cut Records

Artists
 A.G.E.
 Angela
 Antonious
 Amani aka Antonio Neal
 Ayeesha
 Barry G
 Breathe Eazy
 Bruthaz Grimm
 Christ Fa Real
 C.R.O.W.
 D.D.C.
 D.C.P.
 E-Roc (aka Rhymes Monumental)
 Faze
 Fiti Futuristic
 Tha Original Flow 
 FTF (Dr. Chedder & Fila Phil)
 Geno V
 God's Original Gangstaz
 J-ROC
 KIIS
 L.G. Wise
 Lil' Raskull
 Mike Mike
 Mr. Real
 M.V.P.
 Mystery
 NuWine (now known as Hefe Wine)
 Preachas in tha Hood
 Prime Minister
 Rhymes Monumental (aka E-Roc)
 Rubadub
 St8 Young Gangstaz
 Truth
 True II Society

Discography

1993
Rubadub - Reflections of An Ex-Criminal

1995
KIIS - West Coast Thang
Barry G - Rugged Witeness

1996
Rubadub - Mind Of A Gangster
Gina Brown (now known as Gina Green) - In His Time
D.D.C. - Plate Fulla Funk
Lil' Raskull - Controversial All-Star
G.O.G.'z - True 2 Tha Game
Faze - Just Trying Ta Stay Up
GOD's New Creation - Self Titled
Muzik Ta Ride 2 Vol. 1
HHH Vol. - Strickly Gangsta Style

1997
Prime Minister - Prime Time
True 2 Society - Bow Down
Lil' Raskull - Cross Bearing
Preachas in tha Hood - Gangstaz Pain
G.O.G.'z - Resurrected Gangstaz
Geno V - Take Me 2 Tha Homies
L.G. Wise - G's Us 4 Life
Nuwine - Da Bloody 5th
Muzik Ta Ride 2 Vol. 2
HHH Vol. 2 - From Tha Ground Up
Gina Brown - In His Time
Another Way to Praise - Take A Look Back

1998
Prime Minister - Prime Time 2: The Millennium
True 2 Society - Let's Take a Ride
Lil' Raskull - Gory to Glory
Preachas in tha Hood - Tearz Of A Gangsta
E-Roc - The Return
Rhymes Monumental aka E-Roc - Target Earth
G.O.G'z - Pawn's In A Game of Chess
SYG'z - Steady Bangin'
Lord Byron - Keep Tha Fire Burning
Antonious - Good Vs. Evil
D.C.P. - The Last Saint
Bruthaz Grimm - He's Coming
L.G. Wise - Never Alone
Muzik Ta Ride 2 Vol. 3
GT Hit Mix: Wreakin' Thangs
HHH Vol. 3 - Ghetto Drama
Phat Trax R&B Vol. 1

1999
E-Roc - Avalanche
Lil' Raskull - Certified Southern Hits
Preachas in tha Hood - Life Sentence
G.O.G.'z - Tha G Files
SYG'z - Tha Movement
Ayeesha - Listen Closely
Antonious - Principalities
D.C.P. - Ghetto Preacha
C.R.O.W. - Operation K.A.P. (Kill A Pimp)
Bruthaz Grimm - Letter 2 Tha Bruthaz
Muzik Ta Ride 2 Vol. 4
Mr. Real - Humility
HHH Vol. 4 - N-Tyme Mafia
Christ Fa Real - It's Personal
Amani - Issues Of Life
Rhat Trax R&B Vol. 2
GT Greatest Hits Vol. 1

2000
Prime Minister - Inside Out
True 2 Society - All Up In Yo Face
Lil' Raskull - The Day After
Rhymes Monumental aka E-roc - A Lie N Science
D.C.P. - Our Time to Shine
Bruthaz Grimm - ...And Things Will Never Be The Same
F.T.F. - Fireproof?
J-Roc - Last Days: Perelious Times
L.G. Wise - Ghetto Fables: Da 1/2 Ain't Been Told
Mr. Real - A Chosen One
Muzik Ta Ride 2 Vol. 5
GT Greatest Hits Vol. 2
Kandle - Encounters
Angela - Faithful & True

2001
Amani - Songs Of Love
Preachas in tha Hood - Gangsta Hitz
Antonious - This Chapter In My Life
C.R.O.W. - Method Of Attack
L.G. Wise - Greatest Hits
Marod - Degree 40:3
Muzik Ta Ride 2 Vol. 6: 2001
Southern Butter: Hot Out Tha Kitchen
Testimony: Songs of Redemption
King Cyz - Life Or Death
Mystery - The Mystery Is Revealed

2002
Prime Minister & Z.O.E. Click - Reel Life
Rhymes Monumental aka E-Roc - Back 2 Earth
Antonious - Fury (Greatest Hits)
Fiti Futuristic - All In A Days Work
Muzik Ta Ride 2 Vol. 7: From Tha Cross 2 Da Streets
The Gathering: Chicago's Finest

2003
Truth - The Truth Hurts
E-Roc - Greatest Hits

References

External links
 Knolly Williams Homepage
 Grapetree Products
 Throwing Back Love AC Story

Christian hip hop record labels